Georgia first participated at the Olympic Games as an independent nation in 1994 and has sent athletes to compete in every Summer Olympic Games and Winter Olympic Games since then.

Previously, Georgian athletes competed as part of the Soviet Union at the Olympics from 1952 to 1988 and after the dissolution of the Soviet Union, Georgia was part of the Unified Team in 1992.

Georgian athletes have won a total of 40 medals, mostly in wrestling, judo and weightlifting.

The Georgian National Olympic Committee was created in 1989 and recognized by the International Olympic Committee in 1993.

Medals

Medals by Summer Games

Medals by Winter Games

Medals by Summer sport

List of medalists

Flagbearers

Change medalists 

 Giorgi Gogshelidze from bronze to silver (Wrestling at the 2008 Summer Olympics – Men's freestyle 96 kg)
 Arsen Kasabiev from 4th place to silver (Weightlifting at the 2008 Summer Olympics – Men's 94 kg)

Disqualified medalists

See also
 Georgian National Olympic Committee
 Olympic competitors for Georgia
 List of flag bearers for Georgia at the Olympics
 Georgia at the Paralympics

Notes

External links 
 
 
 

 
Olympics